KKRC-FM (97.3 MHz, "97.3 KKRC") is a radio station broadcasting a classic hits format, and serves the Sioux Falls, South Dakota area. The station is currently owned by Townsquare Media.

Its studios are located on Tennis Lane in Sioux Falls, while its transmitter is located near Humboldt.

Previously airing a hot adult contemporary format as KMXC, "Mix 97.3", beginning November 11, 1994, the station debuted its current format and callsign on August 31, 2020, after stunting the weekend prior with a loop of "Back in Time" by Huey Lewis and the News. The first song on KKRC-FM was "Let's Go Crazy" by Prince.

References

External links
97.3 KKRC official website

KRC-FM
Classic hits radio stations in the United States
Radio stations established in 1971
1971 establishments in South Dakota
Townsquare Media radio stations